Halstead is a city in Harvey County, Kansas, United States.  Halstead was named in honor of Murat Halstead, a respected Civil War correspondent and newspaper editor.  As of the 2020 census, the population of the city was 2,179.

History

For millennia, the land now known as Kansas was inhabited by Native Americans.  In 1803, most of modern Kansas was secured by the United States as part of the Louisiana Purchase.  In 1854, the Kansas Territory was organized, then in 1861 Kansas became the 34th U.S. state.  In 1872, Harvey County was founded.

Halstead was laid out in 1873. The first post office at Halstead was established in April 1873. Halstead was incorporated as a city in 1877.

Arthur Hertzler, the "Horse-and-Buggy Doctor," devoted much of his life and energies to the medical environment of Halstead, founding a clinic and hospital for the area residents.

Geography
Halstead is located at coordinates 38.0014004, -97.5086518 in the state of Kansas.

Climate
The climate in this area is characterized by hot, humid summers and generally mild to cool winters.  According to the Köppen Climate Classification system, Halstead has a humid subtropical climate, abbreviated "Cfa" on climate maps.

Demographics

2010 census
As of the census of 2010, there were 2,085 people, 825 households, and 572 families residing in the city. The racial makeup of the city was 96.7% White, 0.5% African American, 0.2% Native American, 0.3% Asian, 0.7% from other races, and 1.5% from two or more races. Hispanic or Latino of any race were 3.9% of the population.

There were 825 households, of which 36.4% had children under the age of 18 living with them, 53.7% were married couples living together, 12.2% had a female householder with no husband present, 3.4% had a male householder with no wife present, and 30.7% were non-families. 28.1% of all households were made up of individuals, and 13.2% had someone living alone who was 65 years of age or older. The average household size was 2.47 and the average family size was 3.00.

The median age in the city was 37.6 years. 28.5% of residents were under the age of 18; 6.1% were between the ages of 18 and 24; 24.4% were from 25 to 44; 24.3% were from 45 to 64; and 16.7% were 65 years of age or older. The gender makeup of the city was 48.0% male and 52.0% female.

2000 census
As of the census of 2000, there were 1,873 people, 760 households, and 528 families residing in the city. The racial makeup of the city was 96.7% White, 0.2% African American, 0.4% Native American, 0.4% Asian, 0.6% from other races, and 1.6% from two or more races. Hispanic or Latino of any race were 2.2% of the population.

There were 760 households, out of which 33.8% had children under the age of 18 living with them, 59.7% were married couples living together, 7.9% had a female householder with no husband present, and 30.4% were non-families. 26.8% of all households were made up of individuals, and 13.2% had someone living alone who was 65 years of age or older. The average household size was 2.44 and the average family size was 2.98.

In the city, the population was spread out, with 26.1% under the age of 18, 8.0% from 18 to 24, 26.3% from 25 to 44, 21.6% from 45 to 64, and 18.0% who were 65 years of age or older. The median age was 38 years. For every 100 females, there were 88.2 males. For every 100 females age 18 and over, there were 87.4 males.

As of 2000 the median income for a household in the city was $42,411, and the median income for a family was $51,458. Males had a median income of $33,239 versus $22,554 for females. The per capita income for the city was $20,252. About 2.2% of families and 5.8% of the population were below the poverty line, including 5.5% of those under age 18 and 7.2% of those age 65 or over.

Area events
 Halstead Old Settlers.

Area attractions
 Halstead Heritage Museum and Depot. In August 1988, the Halstead Historical Society was formed for the sole purpose of purchasing and restoring the Halstead Santa Fe Train Depot Railway Station.  After dedicated efforts and generous sponsorship, the Halstead Heritage Museum and Depot opened on March 18, 1995. The museum has worked to carefully preserve Halstead history and offers exhibits detailing the founding and naming of Halstead, Bernard Warkentin, local Mennonite Heritage, Dr. Arthur E. Hertzler, and the Halstead Hospital School of Nursing. The museum also features the original "swan boat" from Picnic (1955 film) which was primarily filmed in Halstead, as well as many historic artifacts and photos.

Parks and recreation
 Scout Park 
 Riverside Park 
 Williams Park

Education
The community is served by Halstead–Bentley USD 440 public school district. 
 Halstead High School in Halstead.
 Halstead Middle School in Halstead.
 Bentley Primary School in Bentley.

Media

Films
 Picnic (1955) - An ex-college football star turned drifter arrives in a small Kansas town on Labor Day. It was primarily filmed in Halstead.
 The Parade (1984) - A made-for-television movie in which an ex-con returns to his Kansas hometown days before the town's annual Fourth of July parade. It was filmed in Halstead.

Notable people
See also List of people from Harvey County, Kansas
 Jim Roper, NASCAR driver
 Adolph Rupp, NCAA basketball coach

Gallery
 Historic Images of Halstead, Special Photo Collections at Wichita State University Library

See also
 National Register of Historic Places listings in Harvey County, Kansas
 Bernhard Warkentin Homestead
 Threshing Stone
 La Junta Subdivision, branch of the BNSF Railway
 Arkansas Valley Interurban Railway

References

Further reading

External links

 
 Halstead - Directory of Public Officials, League of Kansas Municipalities
 Halstead City Map, KDOT

Cities in Kansas
Cities in Harvey County, Kansas
Wichita, KS Metropolitan Statistical Area
German-Russian culture in Kansas
Populated places established in 1877
Russian Mennonite diaspora in the United States
1877 establishments in Kansas